The 2013 Black-Eyed Susan Stakes was the 89th running of the Black-Eyed Susan Stakes. The race took place on May 17, 2013, and was televised in the United States on the NBC Sports Network. Ridden by jockey Joel Rosario, Fiftyshadesofhay won the race by a scant neck over runner-up Marathon Lady. Approximate post time on the Friday evening before the Preakness Stakes was 4:47 p.m. Eastern Time. The Maryland Jockey Club raised the purse to $500,000 for the 89th running. This made The Black-Eyed-Susan Stakes the third highest payout for a race restricted to three-year-old fillies. The race was run over a fast track in a final time of 1:52.73.  The Maryland Jockey Club reported total attendance of 39,957. The attendance at Pimlico Race Course that day was a record crowd for Black-Eyed Susan Stakes Day.

Payout 

The 89th Black-Eyed Susan Stakes Payout Schedule

$2 Exacta:  (3–9) paid   $54.00

$2 Trifecta:  (3–9–8) paid   $333.40

$1 Superfecta:  (3–9–8–6) paid   $532.30

The full chart 

 Winning Breeder: WinStar Farm; (KY)  
 Final Time: 1:52.73
 Track Condition: Fast
 Total Attendance: 39,957

See also 
 2013 Preakness Stakes
 Black-Eyed Susan Stakes Stakes "top three finishers" and # of  starters

References

External links 
 Official Black-Eyed Susan Stakes website
 Official Preakness website

2013 in horse racing
Horse races in Maryland
2013 in American sports
2013 in sports in Maryland
Black-Eyed Susan Stakes